The men's pole vault at the 2016 European Athletics Championships took place at the Olympic Stadium on 6 and 8 July.

Records

Schedule

Results

Qualification

Qualification: 5.65 m (Q) or best 12 performances (q)

Final

References

Pole vault
Pole vault at the European Athletics Championships